Bourton and Draycote is a civil parish in the Rugby borough of Warwickshire, England which consists of the villages of Bourton-on-Dunsmore and Draycote. Of these, Bourton is the larger. In the 2001 Census the parish had a population of 231, increasing to 275 at the 2011 Census.

References

External links
Bourton & Draycote Parish Council

Civil parishes in Warwickshire